Francesca D'Aloja (born 21 April 1963) is an Italian film, television and stage actress.

Life and career 
Born in Rome, D'Aloja started her career as a theater actress. In cinema, after several secondary roles, she made her debut as main actress in 1992, in the comedy film Quando eravamo repressi. In 1998 she was nominated to Globo d'oro for best actress thanks to her performance in Ferzan Özpetek's Hamam. D'Aloja is married to the director and screenwriter Marco Risi.

Selected filmography 
 Stasera a casa di Alice (1990)
 A Season of Giants (1990)
 Infelici e contenti (1992)
 When We Were Repressed (1992)
 The Escort (1993)
 Bonus malus (1993)
 Hamam (1997)
 Kaputt Mundi (1998)
 The Dinner (1998)
 Scarlet Diva (2000)
 Il bello delle donne (2002)
 Adored (2003)
 The Fifth Wheel (2013)

References

External links 
 

Italian film actresses
Italian television actresses
Italian stage actresses
1963 births
Actresses from Rome
Living people